6,7,4′-Trihydroxyflavone (6,7,4'-THF) is a flavone, a naturally occurring flavonoid-like chemical compound which is found in heartwood of Dalbergia odorifera, which is called "Jiangxiang" in Traditional Chinese medicine.

References 

Flavones